The Coupe de France 1976–77 was its 60th edition. It was won by AS Saint-Étienne which defeated Stade de Reims in the Final.

Round of 16

Quarter-finals

Semi-finals
First round

Second round

Final

References

French federation

1976–77 domestic association football cups
1976–77 in French football
1976-77